Wisner is a surname. Notable people with the surname include:

 Frank Wisner (1910–1965), American civil servant and father of Frank G. Wisner
 Frank G. Wisner (born 1938), American diplomat and son of Frank Wisner
 Henry Wisner (c. 1720–1790), American politician
 Moses Wisner (1815–1863), American politician